Jack Holland (1922-1994) was an Australian professional rugby league footballer who played in the 1940s and 1950s. An Australian international and New South Wales interstate representative forward, he played his club football in Sydney's NSWRFL Premiership for the St. George club.

Background
Holland was born in Sydney, New South Wales, Australia on 19 August 1922.

Career
Holland served in the Army during World War II.  Commencing his first-grade NSWRFL Premiership playing career with St. George in 1947,  he was selected to represent New South Wales in 1948.

In 1948 Holland was also first selected for the Australian national team, becoming Kangaroo No. 252. He also went on the 1948-49 Kangaroo tour.

At the end of the 1949 NSWRFL season, Holland played for St. George at prop forward in their grand final victory against South Sydney. During the 1951 French rugby league tour of Australia and New Zealand, Holland was selected to play for the Sydney representative rugby league team that drew with the Les Chanticleers. After playing six seasons at St. George, the 1952 NSWRFL season was the last to feature Holland.

Holland died in 1994, aged 71.

References

1922 births
1994 deaths
Sportsmen from New South Wales
Rugby league players from Sydney
St. George Dragons players
City New South Wales rugby league team players
New South Wales rugby league team players
Australia national rugby league team players
Rugby league props
Australian Army personnel of World War II